Shanice Williams (born July 9, 1996) is an American actress and singer best known for her performance as Dorothy in the televised live performance of NBC's The Wiz Live! in December 2015.

Biography
She grew up in Rahway, New Jersey. Her mother, Andrea Holmes, is a postal worker; and her father, Shelton Williams, is a security guard. Her cousin, Willis Williams, is an independent professional wrestler known as Ali Shabazz.
She attended Rahway High School, where she performed as part of her school's drama program.

Williams studied briefly at the American Musical and Dramatic Academy in Los Angeles, but began her singing career in her grandfather's choir.

Her first major break was playing the role of Dorothy in The Wiz Live!, a televised program based on the 1975 Tony award-winning, Broadway theatrical production, The Wiz: The Super Soul Musical "Wonderful Wizard of Oz", which reinvented American author L. Frank Baum's 1900 novel, The Wonderful Wizard of Oz as an African-American story. Williams was selected for the role through an open casting call when she was 18 years old. The production is a collaboration between the NBC broadcast network and the theatrical division of Cirque du Soleil.

In 2017 Williams starred in the award-winning HBO film Manic. For her role in this film, she won best actress in a drama at the New York Television Festival and best actress in a drama at SeriesFest.

In 2018 Williams made her New York stage and Off-Broadway debut in Little Rock, a play about the Little Rock Nine. A year later, Williams was cast in the Hollywood Bowl production of Into the Woods as Little Red Ridinghood, alongside Broadway stars Sutton Foster, Cheyenne Jackson, Sierra Boggess, Patina Miller and guest-starring Whoopi Goldberg, which ran July 26–28.

References

External links
 

1996 births
American television actresses
21st-century American actresses
21st-century American singers
Actresses from New Jersey
21st-century African-American women singers
African-American actresses
Place of birth missing (living people)
People from Rahway, New Jersey
Rahway High School alumni
Living people
21st-century American women singers